Ayelet Shaked (born 7 May 1976) is an Israeli politician, activist, and software engineer who served as Minister of Interior from 2021 to 2022. She previously served as a member of the Knesset for The Jewish Home from 2013 to 2018, after which she became a member of the New Right. She formerly represented the Yamina alliance in the Knesset. She was Minister of Justice from 2015 to 2019. Although until 2018 she was representing a religious party, Shaked identifies as a secular politician.

She began her career in Tel Aviv's high-tech industry, working as an engineer at Texas Instruments. In 2010, she established the My Israel extra-parliamentary movement with Naftali Bennett and led it until May 2012. In 2019, she established the New Right together with Bennett. After the party did not pass the electoral threshold in the April 2019 Israeli legislative election, Shaked planned to join Likud, but Miri Regev did not allow her to do so. Following Benjamin Netanyahu's failure to form a coalition government and the pending September 2019 Israeli legislative election, Shaked ended up succeeding Bennett as the chairwoman of the New Right, and later became the leader of the Yamina alliance.

She is considered one of Israel's most active and influential legislators, and initiated and drafted laws including Israel's 2016 NGO law, its comprehensive law against terrorism, a version of the basic law proposal on Israel as the nation-state of the Jewish people, as well as a law limiting the powers of the Israeli Supreme Court.

Early life and career
Shaked was born Ayelet Ben Shaul in Tel Aviv to a well-educated upper-middle-class Israeli family. Her paternal grandmother immigrated to Israel from Iraq as a single mother in the 1950s as part of the Jewish exodus from Arab and Muslim countries, carefully investing her money in property and the education of her children.  Her father was an accountant and voted Likud.  Shaked describes herself as "half-Iraqi and proud of it". Her mother, a Bible teacher, was from a center-left Ashkenazi family whose ancestors migrated to Palestine from the Russian Empire and Romania in the 1880s as part of the First Aliyah.

She grew up in the upper-middle-class Bavli neighborhood of Tel Aviv. She identified her political awakening and right-wing orientation to when she was 8 years old, after watching a television debate between Yitzhak Shamir and Shimon Peres, where she supported the right-wing views of Shamir.  As a teenager, she was a main instructor in the Hebrew Scouts Movement in Israel. At high-school, she held right-wing views but was not highly political.

She served in the IDF as an infantry instructor in the Golani Brigade, serving in the 12th Barak (Lightning) battalion and Sayaret Golani (the special forces unit within the Golani Brigade). It was while she was in the army, that her right-wing views were strengthened. At Tel Aviv University, she obtained a BSc in electrical engineering and computer science. She began her career in the Tel Aviv high-tech industry, working as a software engineer at Texas Instruments and later becoming manager of the company's marketing.

Public career
From 2006 to 2008, Shaked was office director for the office of Benjamin Netanyahu. In 2010 she established My Israel with Naftali Bennett and led it until May 2012.

From the end of 2011, Shaked campaigned against illegal immigration from Africa to Israel, saying that it poses a threat to the state and also involves severe economic damage. She also campaigned against Galei Tzahal saying it had a "left-leaning agenda".

In January 2012, Shaked was elected to serve as a member of the Likud's Central Committee; however, in June 2012 she resigned and joined the Jewish Home. On 14 November 2012, she won third place in the party's primaries and was placed in the fifth spot on the Jewish Home list for the 2013 elections. With the list winning 12 seats, Shaked became the only secular Jewish Home MK. She subsequently joined the Economic Affairs Committee, the House Committee, and the Committee on Foreign Workers, and served as an alternate member on the Finance Committee. She also chaired the Knesset Committee for the Enforcement of the Security Service Law and the National-Civilian Service Law and the Special Committee for the Equal Sharing of the Burden Bill.

In June 2014, Shaked posted an article by the late Israeli writer Uri Elitzur on Facebook. The Facebook post was variously described in the media as calling Palestinian children "little snakes" and appearing to justify mass punishment of Palestinians. Based upon the Facebook post, the then Turkish Prime Minister Recep Tayyip Erdoğan said that Shaked's mindset was no different from Adolf Hitler's. Israeli Prime Minister Benjamin Netanyahu condemned Erdoğan's comments, stating "Erdogan's anti-Semitic comments profaned the memory of the Holocaust." The leader of Israeli leftist Meretz party, Zehava Gal-On, suggested that "because of the presidential election Erdoğan has lost control." Shaked stated that her post was portrayed falsely in the media, especially in that the article was presented as her own words rather than Elitzur's. She said, "I refer specifically to 'Daily Beast' writer Gideon Resnick, who so misrepresented the facts in one of my recent Facebook posts, one has to wonder if his hatred for my country hasn’t rendered him outright useless to his website and his readers."

In 2015, Shaked won the primary election for the Jewish Home Party, which was considered an achievement as a secular female politician within a religious party.

In December 2018 Shaked was amongst the Jewish Home MKs to leave the party and form the breakaway New Right party. In the April 2019 Knesset elections, New Right narrowly failed to cross the electoral threshold; as a result, Shaked did not gain a seat in the 21st Knesset. Following the loss, Shaked initially announced that she will take a break from politics for an undetermined period of time.

On 30 May 2019, after Netanyahu failed to form a governing coalition, the Knesset voted to dissolve itself and a snap election was called which was set to be held on 17 September. Shaked announced on 21 July that she would take part in the elections as the leader of New Right and on 29 July as the leader of the Yamina alliance, which is composed of the New Right, Tkuma and the Jewish Home. Yamina won seven seats at the elections. After no MK was able to form a government, yet another election was called, set to be held on 2 March 2020. At this election, Yamina won six seats.

Minister of Justice
Shaked was placed third on the Jewish Home list for the 2015 elections, and was re-elected to the Knesset. On 6 May 2015, it was reported that Prime Minister Benjamin Netanyahu had agreed to appoint Shaked as Minister of Justice as part of a plan to form a new coalition government. Shaked took office as Justice Minister on 14 May 2015.

In July 2015, Shaked announced that she was forming a committee to create a stable legal structure for the Israeli settlements in the West Bank. The formation of the committee was agreed upon in the coalition agreement between Bayit Yehudi and Likud. She has stated: "There are many areas in Judea and Samaria, whose legal status has not been organized. It's time to remove the legal ambiguity, and allow the residents of Judea and Samaria, many of whom live in settlements that were built by the Israeli government, to live without the persistent fear of challenges to their property ownership". The legal status of the West Bank is disputed; the Palestinians, the UN, human rights organizations and most of the international community consider it to be occupied Palestinian territory.

In January 2016, Shaked sponsored a bill in the Knesset that would require non-governmental organizations ("NGOs") that receive a majority of their funding from "foreign government entities" to be so labeled. In an interview in The Washington Post she stated that the law would foster transparency by giving the public the right "to know which NGOs are receiving most of their support from foreign governments and therefore representing foreign government interests."

In June 2016 the Israeli Knesset passed a comprehensive law against terrorism, forbidding any kind of terrorism and support of terrorism, and setting severe punishments for terrorists. The law also regulates legal efforts against terrorism and counter-terrorism measures. The law was sponsored and promoted by Justice Minister Shaked.

In June 2019 Netanyahu dismissed Shaked from the government.

Political views

Views on Jewish identity and democracy 
Referencing the Knesset's basic law that Israel will be a Jewish and democratic state, Shaked opposes the view that the two values are in any way incompatible, arguing that "alongside the view that there is a constant struggle and a clash of civilizations between 'Jewish' and 'democratic,' I believe we can propose another model."

Shaked argues that the key of concepts of property rights, the rejection of the divine right of kings, the importance of the separation of powers, and civil liberty are a byproduct of the Jewish philosophical tradition. She states: "On what did Locke base the right to property if not the chapters on creation? After all, Locke's Second Treatise of Government is inspired by a close textual reading of The Book of Genesis." She concludes that it was "not primarily Roman law or the democratic tradition of the Athenian polis that shaped and forged the modern democratic tradition in Europe or the United States, but Jewish tradition—joined, of course,  by other traditions." She proposes that "it is precisely when we wish to promote advanced processes of democratization in Israel that we must deepen its Jewish identity. These identities clearly do not contradict each other; on the contrary, I believe that they strengthen each other."

Zionism 
In a controversial 2017 speech to the Israel Bar Association, Shaked stated that the Israeli judicial branch operates as if in a "dream", adopting a "utopian and universal worldview... Only a moral and political revolution of the magnitude of the revolution we saw in the 90s, but one reaffirming the accomplishments of Zionism and its unchanging positions may turn this problematic tide." She argued that the Basic Law proposal: Israel as the Nation-State of the Jewish People, of which she is an advocate and architect, will lead to a "moral and political revolution in Israel...  It's a call to rouse from this dream. It's an overall perception bringing back the principles of our founding fathers to the forefront of the law. It moves Zionism and the deepest and most basic components of our identity from the blind spot it currently occupies in the judicial realm to its rightful place: under the spotlight." Shaked states that "Individual rights are almost sacred to me, but not devoid of context, not when cut off from our Israeli uniqueness, our national missions, our history, and our Zionist challenges."

Palestinian family reunification 
In 2022, Shaked suggested renewing citizenship legislation that had expired in July 2021 after the Knesset failed to renew it. She sponsored a bill proposing to prevent Palestinian family unification (residency for Palestinian citizens married to Israeli citizens). She cited security concerns and "demographic reasons", and added that it was meant to stop the "creeping right of return". The bill was blocked after Meretz filed an objection, sending the bill back to the cabinet for further appraisal.

Judicial views 

Shaked seeks to limit the power of the Israeli judiciary. She argues that the role of the judiciary needs to be delineated and restricted, saying: "Is it still correct to say of the judiciary in Israel what Alexander Hamilton said about the court that he knew, that it 'has no influence over either the sword or the purse'? Is it really true that the judiciary in Israel has 'no direction either of the strength or of the wealth of the society'? To my mind, this is very doubtful. In fact, it is inconceivable to me that a judicial body that bears no responsibility for filling the purse permits itself to empty it, but unfortunately, this is the situation in Israel today ... The new tracks that I seek to lay—carefully, while protecting the independence and dignity of the court—are meant to define more precisely the routes of each of the branches, legislative, executive, and judicial, and thus to enable regular traffic and prevent future collisions."

She writes, referencing the arguments of Alexis de Tocqueville, that the long-term damage of normalizing judicial intervention has to be distinguished from the justness of any particular legal decision, stating: "[O]nly a person with real patience who knows that the advantage of democratic government lies not in its immunity from errors, but in the fact that its errors can be corrected in the long term ... only a person like this could understand the enormous benefits of long-term governance power and what de Tocqueville meant when he spoke of the healthy influence of the government's ability to govern effectively. Tocqueville's words must be borne in mind as we lay the new tracks regulating the relations between the Supreme Court and the other branches of government. The healthy influence of governance emerges in ways that are not obvious, and certainly not in a brief focused glance, which misses the aggregate damages caused when the court repeatedly strikes down the products of the government and the Knesset." Shaked concludes that the judicial system must "give enough power and leeway to elected officials while minimizing the harm to the individual and giving maximum consideration to the individual’s freedom to shape his life as he wishes".

Sometimes nicknamed the "Iron Lady" because of her intransigence in repressing crimes committed by Palestinians, as well as for her nationalist positions, she supports the death penalty for individuals who have committed terrorist acts, including for Jews who killed Palestinians; however, she considers that the death penalty should only apply in the most extreme cases.

Economic views 
Shaked argues that the Israeli economy is insufficiently capitalistic. As part of a 20-page treatise she wrote in an academic law journal in 2016 on the structure of the Israeli legal system, she argues that the Israeli economy is suffering from massive over-regulation and that the fight to de-regulate the economy is a constant uphill battle.

Opposition to executive pay limits 
Shaked opposes the imposition of limits on executive pay. She argues that limiting executive pay means that "banks and pension funds... are having trouble finding talented managers interested in being company officers. Good senior managers are looking for new directions, and are seeking to join other sectors to which the law does not apply, I'm asking you to refrain from enacting legislation where it is not needed. Unnecessary legislation is harmful legislation. It harms the economy on a macro scale and the individual on a micro-scale."

Kurdish independence 

Shaked has repeatedly stressed her support for an independent Kurdistan. Shaked says as the Sykes-Picot Agreement breaks apart, "the greatest opportunity that stands before us could come from strengthening the connections with the Kurdish nation."  Shaked says, “the Jewish and Kurdish nations share a history... of mutual respect, mutual interests,” including fighting Islamic State. Shaked has additionally cited the high number of women serving in Kurdish armed forces.

Cannabis decriminalization 
Shaked supports and has legislated for the decriminalization of cannabis consumption in Israel. In 2017, as Minister of Justice, Shaked submitted legislation to decriminalize the recreational use of cannabis.  On successfully passing the legislation, Shaked said "Whether one supports use of cannabis or is opposed, it is wrong to judge cannabis users per criminal law and its derivatives."

Personal life
Shaked is married to Ofir Shaked, a former fighter pilot in the Israeli Air Force. They have two children and live in Bavli, Tel Aviv. She is an admirer of Steve Jobs. She was influenced by Ayn Rand, in particular The Fountainhead and Atlas Shrugged. She describes her personality as 'intellectual' and 'systematic'.

Shaked retired from political life after Yamina failed to win Knesset seats in the 2022 Israeli legislative election and took a position heading Kardan Real Estate Group.

Awards and recognition
In 2012, Shaked won the Abramowitz Israeli Prize for Media Criticism.
In 2012, Shaked was included in the Globes list of the 50 most influential women.
In 2013, Shaked ranked 1st (with Shelly Yachimovich) as outstanding Knesset Member for the summer session by the Knesset Channel.
In 2014, Shaked ranked 2nd as outstanding Knesset Member for the winter session by the Knesset Channel.
In 2015 The Jerusalem Post ranked Shaked as the 33rd most prominent Jewish person in the world.
In 2015 the magazine Forbes Israel ranked Shaked as the 5th most prominent woman in Israel.
In 2015 Shaked was elected as "Woman of the Year" in Israel by Lady Globes magazine.
In 2016, Shaked was ranked as the sixth most influential person in Israel, by Maariv.
In 2017, Shaked was chosen as 'Woman of the year' and 'Israel's most influential woman', by Forbes Israel. 
In 2017, Shaked was chosen as 'Israel's most influential woman', by Globes.
In 2018, Shaked was chosen as 'Israel's most influential woman' by Forbes Israel, for the second year in a row.

References

External links

1976 births
Living people
21st-century Israeli women politicians
Israeli computer programmers
Israeli people of Iraqi-Jewish descent
Israeli people of Romanian-Jewish descent
Israeli people of Russian-Jewish descent
Israeli political activists
Israeli software engineers
Jewish activists
Jewish engineers
Jewish Israeli politicians
Members of the 19th Knesset (2013–2015)
Members of the 20th Knesset (2015–2019)
Members of the 22nd Knesset (2019–2020)
Members of the 23rd Knesset (2020–2021)
Members of the 24th Knesset (2021–2022)
Ministers of Justice of Israel
Ministers of Internal Affairs of Israel
People from Tel Aviv
Tel Aviv University alumni
Texas Instruments people
The Jewish Home politicians
Female justice ministers
Women members of the Knesset
Jewish women politicians
Israeli secularists
Female interior ministers
Women government ministers of Israel